Firelight is a 1964 American science fiction adventure film written and directed by Steven Spielberg at the age of 17. Made on a budget of $500, the film was shown at a local cinema and generated a profit of $1. "I counted the receipts that night", Spielberg has recalled, "And we charged a dollar a ticket. Five hundred people came to the movie and I think somebody probably paid two dollars, because we made one dollar profit that night, and that was it."

Only three minutes and forty seconds of footage has been made public, about 3% of the original length. Spielberg returned to its subject matter for his third major film, Close Encounters of the Third Kind (1977).

Plot
Firelight follows a group of scientists — particularly Tony Karcher and UFO believer Howard Richards — as they investigate a series of colored lights in the sky and the subsequent disappearance of people, animals and objects from the fictional American town of Freeport, Arizona. Among those abducted are a dog, a unit of soldiers and a young girl named Lisa, whose abduction induces a heart attack in her mother. The film has sub-plots involving marital discord between Karcher and his wife Debbie, and the obsessive quest of Richards to convince the CIA that alien life exists. The twist comes as the aliens, represented by three shadows, reveal their purpose: to transport Freeport to their home planet Altaris to create a human zoo.

Cast
Many of the cast for Firelight were from the Arcadia High School productions of Guys and Dolls and I Remember Mama. Spielberg's sister had a leading role.

 Clark Lohr as Howard Richards
 Carolyn Owen as Lisa's Mother
 Robert Robyn as Tony Karcher
 Nancy Spielberg as Lisa
 Beth Weber as Debbie
 Margaret Peyou as Helen Richards
 Warner Marshall as Soldier
 Dede Pisani as Lover
 Tina Lanser as Maid
 Chuck Case as Teenage Boy

Production and music
Spielberg composed the music for Firelight, his first original score, on his clarinet. Spielberg's mother, a former pianist, transposed the score to piano and then to sheet music. The Arcadia High School band then performed the score for the film.

The film was shot on weekends and evenings. Many scenes were shot at the Spielberg home and near the garage. Outside shots were filmed in scrub land near Spielberg's home and school.

Release and analysis
Firelight premiered on March 24, 1964, at Spielberg's local cinema, the Phoenix Little Theatre, in Phoenix, Arizona. Spielberg managed to sell (through the use of advertising by friends and family) 500 tickets at one dollar each.

Excerpts of Firelight show a distinct Spielberg visual style and his use of tracking shots. Firelight came to form a basis of Spielberg's later hit movie Close Encounters of the Third Kind.

References

External links
 
 

1964 films
Films directed by Steven Spielberg
Amateur filmmaking
Alien abduction films
Alien visitations in films
1960s lost films
1960s English-language films
Lost American films
American science fiction adventure films
1960s American films